Shame on You (The Native Years) is the second album released by Welsh alternative rock band the Darling Buds. Released in 1990, it was a compilation of early songs that the band recorded for Native Records.

All songs were written by Harley Farr and Andrea Lewis.

Track listing
 "Shame on You" (2:04)
 "Valentine" (2:37)
 "Think of Me" (2:31)
 "It's All Up to You" (2:25)
 "That's the Reason" (3:27)
 "Burst" (2:45)
 "When It Feels Good" (4:14)
 "Spin" (2:40)
 "Uptight" (2:49)

Singles

 "Shame on You" (Mar 1988) [Native / BUD 1]
 "It's All Up to You" (Sep 1988) [Epic / BLOND1]

The Darling Buds albums
1990 compilation albums